Haswell's frog (Paracrinia haswelli) is a small ground frog found around coastal swamps in eastern Australia from around Port Macquarie, New South Wales to the Mornington Peninsula in Victoria. It is the only member of the genus Paracrinia.

Description

This species of frog reaches  in length. This frog varies from light grey-brown, pale brown to red-brown above with some darker flecks. There is normally a faint mid-dorsal stripe running down the back. There is also a dark band running from the back of the eye to the shoulder. The top half of the iris is silver. The thighs are red, which gives it another name, the red-groined froglet. The ventral surface of this species is light brown with white patches.

Ecology and behaviour
This species is associated with coastal swamps, particularly in wallum swampland and heathland. This species also inhabits dams, ponds, and ditches in sclerophyll forest and woodland.

Males make an "annk" call from water or on land during most of the year, but most often after rain in autumn and winter. Eggs are laid in water attached to sticks and leaves. The tadpole of this species has very deeply arched tail fins. Metamorphosis occurs during spring and autumn after a tadpole life span of about 100 days. Metamorph frogs measure  and resemble the adult, however, the thigh red colouration is not yet fully developed.

References
Frogs Australia Network-frog call available here.
Frogs of Australia
Anstis, M. 2002. Tadpoles of South-eastern Australia. Reed New Holland: Sydney.
Robinson, M. 2002. A Field Guide to Frogs of Australia. Australian Museum/Reed New Holland: Sydney.

External links
 

Amphibians of New South Wales
Amphibians of Victoria (Australia)
Myobatrachidae
Monotypic amphibian genera
Amphibians described in 1894
Frogs of Australia
Taxa named by Joseph James Fletcher